Elihu Palmer (1764 – April 7, 1806) was an author and advocate of deism in the early days of the United States.

Life
Elihu Palmer was born in Canterbury, Connecticut in 1764. He studied to be a Presbyterian minister at Dartmouth College, where he graduated in 1787. Soon after his graduation, however, he became a deist. After rejecting the Calvinist doctrine of Presbyterianism, Palmer became a physical, spiritual, and intellectual wanderer, ultimately making his way to New York City, where he formed the Deistical Society of New York in 1796.

He resided for a time in Augusta, Georgia, where he collected materials for Jedediah Morse's Geography, and subsequently lived in Philadelphia and New York City. In 1793 he became totally blind from an attack of yellow fever but continued as a public speaker.

Palmer kept writing until the end of his life and published a number of different written works including "A Fourth of July Oration" (1797), and was also the author of The Principles of Nature, or A Development of the Moral Causes of Happiness and Misery among the Human Species. He also founded two newspapers, The Temple of Reason in 1800 and Prospect, or View of the Moral World in 1803.

Works

Further reading

 

1764 births
1806 deaths
Deist philosophers
American deists
American former Protestants
American blind people
People from Canterbury, Connecticut
Former Presbyterians
Dartmouth College alumni